The La Crosse Bobcats were a Continental Basketball Association basketball team located in La Crosse, Wisconsin, from 1996 to the league's bankruptcy in February 2001. The Bobcats were the second CBA team located in La Crosse; previously, the La Crosse Catbirds played from 1985 to 1994. The team hosted its matches at the La Crosse Center.

Don Zierden served as the Bobcats head coach during their inaugural 1996–97 season. The team held their first open tryouts at Viterbo College from October 25 to October 27, 1996.

In 1997, the Bobcats marketing campaign featured commercials depicting La Crosse players hawking sub-par team endorsed products in a home shopping parody. The team's tagline for the commercials were, "Lousy endorsements. Great basketball". No actual La Crosse players were in the commercials since they were filmed during the off-season, so actors were used.

During the 1999 CBA draft, the Bobcats selected former Wisconsin Badgers forward Sam Okey in the eighth round. Okey declined a contract from La Crosse, opting to play in a Turkish professional league. In September 2000, the Bobcats announced that Okey had signed a contract for the upcoming season. Okey first received basketball notoriety in Wisconsin while attending a Cassville prep school. He was a McDonald's High School All-American in 1995.

In 2006, the City of La Crosse dedicated a time capsule which included objects from the city's 150-year history. Buried under a marble slab, the capsule is set to be opened for the city's bicentennial celebration in 2056. A Bobcats pin-back button and program from their inaugural season were included in the capsule.

All-time roster

Chucky Atkins
A. J. Bramlett
James Blackwell
Mark Blount
Gerald Brown
Walter Bond
David Booth
Lazaro Borrell
Mark Boyd
Jon Bryant
Adrian Caldwell
Jerry Carstensen
Robert Churchwell
James Collins
Joe Courtney
Corey Crowder
Jason Crowe
Dennis Davis
Mark Davis
Todd Day
Tony Dumas
Nate Driggers
LaZelle Durden
Acie Earl
Neil Edwards
Jo Jo English
Sharif Fajardo
Rob Feaster
Isaac Fontaine
Casey Frank
Ronnie Fields
Matt Fish
Sherell Ford
Ruben Garces
Tim Gill
Omm'A Givens
Ronnie Grandison
Jermaine Guice
Jack Haley
Emmett Hall
Vince Hamilton
Phil Handy
Steve Hart
Mark Hendrickson
Fred Herzog
Andrell Hoard
Reggie Jackson
Stephen Jackson
Keith Johnson
Danny Jones
Dontae' Jones
Tim Kempton
Bo Kimble
Chris King
Jimmy King
Kirk King
Chris Kingsbury
Jarvis Lang
Doug Lee
Martin Lewis
Jarrod Lovette
Marcus Mann
Erik Martin
Sean Mason
Clint McDaniel
Julius Michalik
Russ Millard
Silas Mills
Jason Miskiri
Tracy Moore
Lawrence Moten
Terquin Mott
Ruben Nembhard
Melvin Newbern
Ed O'Bannon
Sam Okey
Derrick Phelps
Rob Phelps
Mark Pope
Virginijus Praškevičius
Mark Randall
Mike Richardson
Chris Robinson
Rumeal Robinson
Stan Rose
Yamen Sanders
Mark Sanford
Reggie Slater
Charles Smith
Chris Smith
Edward Smith
Andre Spencer
Joe Stephens
Ray Thompson
Keith Tower
Anthony Tucker
Donald Watts
Jermaine Walker
Bubba Wells
Donald Whiteside
Brandon Williams
Trevor Winter

Sources

Season-by-season records

References

Continental Basketball Association teams
Defunct basketball teams in the United States
Sports in La Crosse, Wisconsin
Basketball teams in Wisconsin
Basketball teams established in 1996
Basketball teams disestablished in 2001
1996 establishments in Wisconsin
2001 disestablishments in Wisconsin